Egypt competed at the 2015 World Aquatics Championships in Kazan, Russia from 24 July to 9 August 2015.

Diving

Egyptian divers qualified for the individual spots and synchronized teams at the World Championships.

Men

Women

Mixed

Open water swimming

Egypt fielded a full team of four swimmers to compete in the open water marathon.

Swimming

Egyptian swimmers have achieved qualifying standards in the following events (up to a maximum of 2 swimmers in each event at the A-standard entry time, and 1 at the B-standard):

Men

Women

Synchronized swimming

Egypt has qualified a team of eleven synchronized swimmers to compete in each of the following events.

Women

References

External links
Egyptian Swimming Federation

Nations at the 2015 World Aquatics Championships
2015
World Aquatics Championships